Bogue may refer to:

Places
 Borgue, Dumfries and Galloway, Scotland
 Boghé or Bogué, a town in Mauritania
 Bogue (strait), a strait in the Pearl River, China
 Bogue, a suburb of Montego Bay, Jamaica

United States
 Bogue, Kansas, a city
 Bogue, North Carolina, a town
 Bogue Banks, a barrier island off the mainland of North Carolina
 Bogue Sound, a geographic sound in the state of North Carolina
 Marine Corps Auxiliary Landing Field Bogue or Bogue Field, a landing field located on Bogue Sound

Military
 Bogue-class escort carrier, for service with the U.S. Navy and the Royal Navy
 USS Bogue, an aircraft carrier of the US Navy
 Battle of the Bogue (1856)

People with the surname
 Donald Bogue, American businessman
 George Marquis Bogue (1842–1903), American politician

Other uses
 Esimbi, a language spoken in parts of Cameroon
 Bogue (fish), a genus
 Boops boops or bogue, a species of the family Sparidae

See also
 Bogues, a surname